Bryden Country School (or Bryden) is an independent, preparatory, boarding and day school for boys and girls in Mashonaland West, Zimbabwe. The school was founded in 1983.

Bryden Country School is a member of the Association of Trust Schools (ATS) and the Head is a member of the Conference of Heads of Independent Schools in Zimbabwe (CHISZ).

History
In September 1981, a group of local farmers and businessmen from Chegutu convened to discuss the possibilities of creating a school. The farm was donated by Mr and Mrs Black on condition that the school be named after Mr Black’s great great grandmother, Jane Bryden.

Bryden Country School was officially opened on 27 January 1983 with Pete Sinclair as the headmaster of the school and an enrollment of seventy children.

Notable alumni
 Rick Cosnett - Film and television actor
 Craig Ervine - Zimbabwean cricketer
 Sean Ervine - Zimbabwean cricketer

See also
 List of schools in Zimbabwe

References

External links
  Official website
  on the ATS website
 
 

Private schools in Zimbabwe
Co-educational schools in Zimbabwe
Day schools in Zimbabwe
Boarding schools in Zimbabwe
Educational institutions established in 1983
1983 establishments in Zimbabwe
Member schools of the Association of Trust Schools
Education in Mashonaland West Province